Sydney Ringer FRS (March 1835 – 14 October 1910) was a British clinician, physiologist and pharmacologist, best known for inventing Ringer's solution. He was born in 1835 in Norwich, England and died following a stroke in 1910 in Lastingham, Yorkshire, England. His gravestone and some other records report 1835 for his birth, some census records and other documents suggest 1836, but his baptismal record at St Mary's Baptist Chapel (referred to in Ringer's own will) confirms this was 1835.

Life
Born into a non-conformist family (often, but incorrectly described as 'Quaker') in Norwich, Ringer's father died in 1843, while he was still very young. 

Ringer's early education was at a Baptist school in Norwich founded by the father of John Sherren Brewer Jnr. His school fellows included the headmaster's grandson Henry William Brewer, later a notable architectural illustrator, as well as the orientalist Professor Robert Lubbock Bensly and the architect Edward Boardman. A significant teacher was JS Brewer's son, the hugely successful author Revd Dr Ebenezer Cobham Brewer.

Before starting at medical school, Ringer worked for a year, from September 1853, at the Norfolk & Norwich hospital under the surgeon, B H Norgate (who had signed his father's death certificate).

For his university education, as a non-conformist, Ringer studied Medicine at University College London from 1854 and graduated in 1860. During this time, Ringer trained at University College Hospital before starting his professional career there. By 1866, Ringer had been promoted to full physician. From 1865 to 1869, Ringer also served as Assistant Physician at the Great Ormond Street Hospital for Children'.

During his academic career, Ringer became a Fellow of the Royal College of Physicians in 1870 and Fellow of the Royal Society in 1885. At UCH throughout his career, he served successively as Professor of Materia Medica (1862-78), the Principles & Practice of Medicine (1878-87) and as the Holme Professor of Clinical Medicine from 1887 to 1900.

His most celebrated work in research was conducted at University College's incipient Department of Physiology. He established the minimal ionic composition (simple chloride salts of sodium, potassium and calcium) of a physiological saline. His demonstration of the necessity for extracellular calcium to sustain cardiac muscle contraction in the spontaneously beating frog heart was the first to reveal the physiological importance of calcium subsequently discovered for many cellular processes (see e.g. Calcium metabolism, Calcium in biology). This work provided the basis of Ringer's solution of which there followed many derivatives, modified to suit different species and experimental conditions. Clinically important derivatives include Ringer's lactate also known as Hartmann's solution.

In 2007 (revised 2014, 2020) a brief biography of Ringer: A Solution for the Heart: a brief biography of Professor Sydney Ringer MD FRS (1835-1910)'  by DJ Miller was published by The Physiological Society, of which Ringer was an early member. A Blue Plaque to Ringer  was unveiled at University College London in March 2022.

References

Sources

English pharmacologists
British medical researchers
Fellows of the Royal Society
1835 births
1910 deaths